Burgh Mill is a Grade II listed tower mill at Burgh, Suffolk, England which has been converted to residential accommodation.

History

Burgh Mill was built in 1842 by John Whitmore the Wickham Market millwright for Francis Buttrum. It replaced an earlier tower mill nearby. The mill was the tallest one built by Whitmore. In 1919, an  engine was installed. The mill worked by wind until 1922 and the machinery was dismantled in 1925 by millwright Amos Clarke. From July 1940 the mill became home to L.1 post of the Observer Corps after moving from their previous location. The high vantage point afforded by the mill enabled the Observers to plot and report the movement of aircraft in the area as part of a nationwide network of observation posts. Post L.1 operated as part of a "cluster" of three such posts L.2 being located at Woolverstone and L.3 at Felixstowe all reporting to 18 Group ROC in Colchester. The building was to remain occupied by the Royal Observer Corps until a new underground post was constructed immediately south west in 1960. The mill was derelict in 1997, but by 2005 it had gained a new galleried cap.

Description

Burgh Mill is a seven-storey tower mill with an ogee cap which has a gallery. It had four Patent sails and was winded by a fantail. The tower is  diameter internally at ground floor level and  diameter internally at curb level.
Recently renovated in 2004, it was reroofed and the brickwork replaced using the original Suffolk white bricks.

Millers

Francis Buttrum 1842-
References for above:-

References

Windmills in Suffolk
Tower mills in the United Kingdom
Windmills completed in 1842
Grinding mills in the United Kingdom
Grade II listed buildings in Suffolk
Grade II listed windmills
Suffolk Coastal